This list of Standard Networks products includes all major standalone services and programs created by Standard Networks, a Madison, Wisconsin-based software company founded in 1989  and acquired by Ipswitch, Inc. in 2008. All products listed are well into their gold releases. This list also includes previous products that are no longer being actively developed.

Client Applications

Secure File Transfer

Terminal Emulation

Server Applications

Secure File Transfer

Previous Projects

References

Computing-related lists